In the Church of Jesus Christ of Latter-day Saints (LDS Church), an area is an administrative unit that typically is composed of multiple stakes and missions. These areas are the primary church administrative unit between individual stakes or missions and the church as a whole.

History
The areas as they now exist were formed in January 1984. Prior to that time, general authorities served as "area supervisors" and at times resided outside of Salt Lake City. In 1984, 13 initial areas were created; by 1992 there were 22, and by early 2007 there were 31. As of April 2022, there are 23 areas.

Administration
Until 2003, each area had a president and two counselors, all of whom were typically general authorities (area seventies sometimes served as counselors). This three-man body was known as the area presidency.  In that year, the church eliminated these presidencies for areas located in the United States and Canada, which were all then placed under the direct supervision of a member of the Presidency of the Seventy, thus freeing more general authorities from specific area assignments. Since these areas were previously administered by area presidencies located at church headquarters in Salt Lake City, the administrative change was not as drastic as it might seem.

In April 2018, the church announced that, effective August 1 of that year, areas in the United States and Canada would once again be supervised by a three-man presidency.  This enabled the Presidency of the Seventy to more fully assist the Quorum of the Twelve Apostles in their duties, and to fill other assignments as needed.

The areas outside the United States and Canada continue to be governed by area presidencies that are typically composed of general authorities and area seventies. These presidency members usually reside in a headquarters city located in the geographic boundaries of the area. Area seventies who serve in these presidencies reside in their own homes, which may or may not be in the area headquarters city.

In 2019, church leaders stated that the 10 North American areas would be merged into six (the Idaho Area merged into the North America Central Area; the North America Northwest Area merged into the North America West Area; and the Utah North, Utah Salt Lake City, and Utah South areas merged into a single Utah Area.

Also in 2019, a structural change occurred in the administration of the Middle East/Africa North Area. In prior years, two general authorities based at church headquarters were assigned oversight for the area. However, beginning in August 2019, a three-man area presidency was established to oversee the area. Two of them were general authorities at church headquarters, while the second counselor was an area seventy living in the area.

In 2019, church leaders also announced the division of the Africa Southeast Area, into the Africa Central and Africa South areas, effective August 1, 2020. Two months later, W. Christopher Waddell, second counselor in the Presiding Bishopric, announced in Johannesburg that the new Africa Central Area would be headquartered in Nairobi, Kenya. 

Then in 2022, additional structural changes affected Europe. The Europe and Europe East areas were split into 3 areas and renamed the Europe Central, Europe East, and Europe North areas. The presidency of the Europe Area became the presidency of the Europe Central Area, with the presidency of the Europe East Area becoming three area seventies. The president and first counselor in the Europe East Area were reassigned to fill the same roles in the Europe North Area, with the second counselor being an area seventy.  The area seventy who had been serving as the second counselor in the Europe East Area was designated an assistant to the Europe North Area presidency, specifically overseeing Ukraine and Moldova, which will be separate from a specific area at the current time.

As of April 2022, the church has 17 areas outside North America and six areas inside North America, for a total of 23. With the changes in Europe, the church now has five area seventies serving in area presidencies. Area assignments are generally announced sometime after April's general conference and are effective August 1.

Summary Statistics

Temples
O=Operating Temples (includes temporary closures)
U=Temples Under Construction
A=Temples publicly announced to be constructed
T=Total Temples (announced and under construction)

Area details
The following details are current as of August 1, 2019, and are taken from the LDS Church Growth Blog, statistical profiles on cumorah.com, and the Facts and Statistics page of the church's official website (www.churchofjesuschrist.org). Ward and branch totals and membership numbers were last updated in 2015.

See also 

 District (LDS Church)
 List of area seventies of The Church of Jesus Christ of Latter-day Saints
 List of general authorities of The Church of Jesus Christ of Latter-day Saints
 Regional representative of the Twelve
 Seventy: Area seventies and additional quorums of seventy

References 

Organizational subdivisions of the Church of Jesus Christ of Latter-day Saints
Christian organizations established in 1984
Types of Latter Day Saint organization